Bruce "Moose" Peterson is an American wildlife, aviation and landscape photographer whose work has been published in a variety of magazines worldwide and in over twenty books.

In 1998, he was the recipient of the John Muir Conservation Award for his efforts as an endangered species advocate. Peterson's primary area of interests center on rare and endangered species in North America, particularly in California.

References

External links

Living people
Year of birth missing (living people)
American photographers
Nature photographers
People from Whittier, California